The Sardinian regional election of 1969 took place on 15 June 1969.

Two more seats were added.

The legislature term rose to five years.

After the election Giovanni Del Rio, the incumbent Christian Democratic President, formed a new government that lasted only some months and was succeeded by a succession of governments that sometimes included the Italian Socialist Party, the Sardinian Action Party and the Italian Democratic Socialist Party.

Results

Sources: Regional Council of Sardinia and Istituto Cattaneo

References

Elections in Sardinia
1969 elections in Italy